Every Song Is About Me is a 2010 Spanish romantic comedy-drama film directed by Jonás Trueba which stars Oriol Vila and Bárbara Lennie, also featuring Bruno Bergonzini, Valeria Alonso, Ángela Cremonte, Miriam Giovanelli and Ramon Fontserè.

Plot 
The story is set in Madrid. The plot follows the relationship between aspiring poet Ramiro and architecture student Andrea, as the former tries to get through the separation from the latter.

Cast

Production 
Every Song is About Me is Jonás Trueba's debut as a feature film director. The screenplay was penned by Trueba alongside . Gerardo Herrero and Mariela Besuievsky were credited as producers. The film is a Castafiore Films and Tornasol Films production and it had the participation of Canal+ and RTVV.

Release 
Distributed by Alta Classics, the film was theatrically released in Spain on 10 December 2010.

Reception 
Andrea G. Bermejo of Cinemanía rated the film with 3 out of 5 stars, deeming the filmmaking to be better than the writing, also considering that part of the film's supporting cast is squandered and that the story features an "intentionally naturalistic tone" "that makes us neither laugh nor cry".

Jordi Costa of Fotogramas scored 2 out of 5 stars, writing that the monologue laid out by Vila's character "is a perfect declaration of principles: Ramiro doesn't want to move... and Jonás Trueba's cinema doesn't seem willing to do so either".

Accolades 

|-
| align = "center" rowspan = "2" | 2011 || rowspan = "2" | 25th Goya Awards || Best New Director || Jonás Trueba ||  || rowspan = "2" | 
|-
| Best New Actor || Oriol Vila ||  
|}

See also 
 List of Spanish films of 2010

References

External links 

2010 comedy films
2010 films
2010 romantic comedy-drama films
Spanish romantic comedy-drama films
Films set in Madrid
Tornasol Films films
2010s Spanish films
2010s Spanish-language films